Sainte-Marie-aux-Chênes is a commune in the Moselle department in Grand Est in north-eastern France.

Coat of arms
The town's name means "Saint Mary at the oaks" in French, and the town's coat of arms can be described as canting: Azure an oak tree eradicated or, between two letters S and M of the last.

See also
 Communes of the Moselle department

References

External links
 

Saintemarieauxchenes